John Albert McDonald (November 24, 1921 – March 13, 1990) was a professional ice hockey player who played 43 games in the National Hockey League with the New York Rangers during the 1943–44 season.

Career
McDonald was born November 24, 1921 in Swan River, Manitoba. Known as Jack, he had a playing height of 6'1" and 215 lbs, which was big for the era. A high-scoring left winger, he captained the Portage Terriers during the 1939–40 and 1941–42 seasons that won the Memorial Cup. The 1942-43 season was spent with the Flin Flon Bombers of the Saskatchewan Senior Hockey League. McDonald joined the New York Rangers for the 1943–44 season, one of several wartime additions. Playing in 43 NHL games, McDonald scored 10 goals and 9 assists. Persuaded to play in the Western Hockey League by good friend Alex Shibicky, McDonald played in the west for the next 6 years. After his hockey career he worked for the Hudson Bay Company as a bush pilot in northern Manitoba and Ontario. A long time recreation professional Jack managed hockey rinks all over Canada. His last stop was at the Burnaby Winter Club where he and Shibicky reunited some 30 years later and coached many players who went on to NHL careers.

Career statistics

Regular season and playoffs

References

External links
 

1921 births
1990 deaths
Canadian expatriate ice hockey players in the United States
Canadian ice hockey right wingers
Edmonton Flyers (WHL) players
Flin Flon Bombers players
Ice hockey people from Manitoba
New Westminster Royals (WHL) players
New York Rangers players
People from Swan River, Manitoba
Portage Terriers players
Portland Eagles players